Beitima or Baytima is a Syrian village in the Qatana District of the Rif Dimashq Governorate. According to the Syria Central Bureau of Statistics (CBS), Beitima had a population of 3,366 in the 2004 census.

History
In 1838, Eli Smith noted Beitima's population as Sunni Muslim.

References

Bibliography

External links

Populated places in Qatana District